

New lines in East Africa

2010 

 Dakar-Port Sudan Railway

2008

2007
According to Railway Gazette International of November 2007, East Africa (TZ, KE, ET and UG) are proposing lines aplenty.

  Kasese, Uganda to  Kisangani, DRCongo
  Gulu to  Nimule and  Juba in Sudan
  Pakwach, Uganda to  Juba and  Wau in Sudan
  Garissa, Kenya to  Addis Abeba in Ethiopia
  Lamu to  Garissa and  Juba again
  Masaka, Uganda to  Biharamulo, Tanzania

Another seven (eight?) routes include:

  Mbamba Bay on Lake Nyasa to  Ligunga via  Mchuchuma coal mines.
  Ligunga to  Mlimba
  Dar-es-Salaam to port of  Mtwara
  Tunduma on TZ-ZM border via  Sumbawanga and  Mpanda to   Kigoma
  Uvinza to  Bujumbura, in Burundi
  Bagamoyo to  Kidomole
  Isaka Dry Port to  Kigali in Rwanda

Gauge unification 

Triple gauge for the three main gauges in Africa are a practible solution for mixed gauge tracks.

Narrow  gauge and Metre  gauge are too similar (67mm) to allow third rail dual gauge. Four rails must be used, which creates a third gauge, which may as well be  gauge.

See also
 Union of African Railways

References

Rail transport timelines